Johan Lund may refer to:

 Johan Ludwig Lund (1777-1867), Danish painter
 Johan Michael Lund (1753–1824), Faroese politician